Sion is a name used in Wales and in other nations.

Welsh name
Siôn or Sion is a Welsh form of the English given name John, pronounced in English similarly to the Irish name Seán.

Notable people with the Welsh name include:

People with the surname
Eleri Siôn (born 1971), Welsh radio and television presenter
Llywelyn Siôn (1540–c. 1615), Welsh-language poet
Sawnder Sion (16th century), Welsh poet

People with the given name
Siôn ap Hywel (fl. c. 1490–1532), Welsh-language poet
Sion Bebb (born 1968), Welsh golfer
Sion Blythe (1781–1835), American pastor
Sion Record Bostick (1819–1902), American soldier
Siôn Bradford (1706–1785), Welsh-language poet
Sion Brinn (born 1973), Jamaican swimmer and coach
Siôn Cent (c. 1400–1435/40), Welsh-language poet
Siôn Ceri (fl. early 16th century), Welsh-language poet
Sion Jones (cyclist) (born 1979), Welsh cyclist
Sion Russell Jones (born 1986), Welsh singer and songwriter
Sion Morris (born 1977), Welsh cricketer
Siôn Phylip (1543–1620), Welsh-language poet
Sion Hart Rogers (1825–1874), American politician from North Carolina
Siôn Simon (born 1968), British politician from Birmingham Erdington
Sion Spence (born 2000), Welsh footballer
Siôn Treredyn or John Edwards (c. 1605–1656), Welsh priest and translator
Siôn Tudur or John Tudur (c. 1522–1602), Welsh-language poet

Fictional and mythical characters
Siôn Corn, Welsh name of Father Christmas
Twm Siôn Cati or Welsh Wizard, Welsh figure in folklore

Other versions of Sion
People with the name "Sion" other than the Welsh name include:

People with the given name
Sion Sono (born 1961), Japanese filmmaker and poet

People with the surname
 Constantin Sion, Moldavian chronicler
 Gheorghe Sion, Moldavian and Romanian poet and playwright
 Ioan Sion, Romanian general
 Maurice Sion (1927–2018), American-Canadian mathematician, known for Sion's minimax theorem
 Ion Theodorescu-Sion, Romanian painter

Fictional characters
Sion Eltnam Atlasia, a character in the dōjin soft fighter series Melty Blood
Darth Sion, a character in the video game Star Wars: Knights of the Old Republic II: The Sith Lords
Sion, the Undead Juggernaut, a playable champion character in the video game League of Legends
Sion Todo, a character in the Japanese anime and arcade game PriPara

See also

Sean (name)
John (name)
Shion, a name
Shôn, given name

Welsh masculine given names
Romanian-language surnames